Vanuatu competed at the 2019 Pacific Games in Apia, Samoa from 7 to 20 July 2019. The country participated in fourteen sports at the 2019 games.

Archery

Athletics

Basketball

5x5

Men's basketball
 TBC

Women's basketball
 TBC

3x3

Men
 TBC

Women
 TBC

Boxing

Cricket

Football

Men's football

Squad
TBC

Women's football

Squad
TBC

Golf

Vanuatu qualified five players for the 2019 tournament:

Men
 Daniel Mansale
 Josepho Matauatu
 Guillaume Bernier
 Anthony Nabanga

Women
 Ata Mansale

Judo

Sailing

Swimming

Table tennis

Taekwondo

Volleyball

Beach volleyball

Weightlifting

References

Nations at the 2019 Pacific Games
2019